Losikha is a rural locality (a settlement) in Bayunovoklyuchevsky Selsoviet, Pervomaysky District, Altai Krai, Russia. The population was 44 as of 2013. There are 2 streets.

Geography 
Losikha is located 23 km southeast of Novoaltaysk (the district's administrative centre) by road. Pokrovka is the nearest rural locality.

References 

Rural localities in Pervomaysky District, Altai Krai